Curtis's Charm is a 1995 Canadian comedy-drama film written and directed by John L'Ecuyer in his directorial debut. The film won a special jury citation for Best Canadian Feature Film at the 1995 Toronto International Film Festival.

Based on a short story by Jim Carroll, the film stars Maurice Dean Wint as Curtis, a paranoid drug addict who believes his mother-in-law has cast a voodoo spell on him, which has resulted in his being stalked by a killer squirrel. With the help of his friend Jim (Callum Keith Rennie), he tries to devise a talisman to protect him from the curse.

Cast
 Maurice Dean Wint as Curtis
 Callum Keith Rennie as Jim
 Rachael Crawford as Cookie
 Barbara Barnes-Hopkins as Voodoo Ma
 Aron Tager as Park Worker
 Hugh Dillon as Spitting White Trash Thug

Production
Filming began in April 1995, and took place over five weeks. It was shot on black and white 16 mm film.

Release
Curtis's Charm premiered at the Toronto International Film Festival on September 11, 1995.

Awards and nominations
The film garnered two Genie Award nominations at the 17th Genie Awards in 1996:
Best Adapted Screenplay: L'Ecuyer
Best Original Score: Mark Korven (won)

References

External links
 

1995 films
1995 comedy-drama films
1995 directorial debut films
1995 independent films
1990s Canadian films
1990s English-language films
Canadian black-and-white films
Canadian comedy-drama films
Canadian independent films
English-language Canadian films
Films about addiction
Films based on American short stories
Films directed by John L'Ecuyer
Films scored by Mark Korven
Films set in Toronto